The sixth season of the animated television series My Little Pony: Friendship Is Magic, developed by Lauren Faust, originally aired on the Discovery Family channel in the United States. The series is based on Hasbro's My Little Pony line of toys and animated works and is often referred by collectors to be the fourth generation, or "G4", of the My Little Pony franchise. Season 6 of the series premiered on March 26, 2016 on Discovery Family, an American pay television channel partly owned by Hasbro, and concluded on October 22.

The show follows a pony named Twilight Sparkle as she learns about friendship in the town of Ponyville. Twilight continues to learn with her close friends Applejack, Rarity, Fluttershy, Rainbow Dash and Pinkie Pie. Each represents a different face of friendship, and Twilight discovers herself to be a key part of the magical artifacts, the "Elements of Harmony". The ponies share adventures and help out other residents of Ponyville, while working out the troublesome moments in their own friendships.

Development 
On March 31, 2015, Discovery Family announced via press release a sixth season for the series. On January 28, 2016, Yahoo Entertainment released an exclusive clip from the show's upcoming sixth season depicting the baby daughter of Princess Cadance and Shining Armor, Flurry Heart, who will be introduced into the season as a new character. On March 7, 2016, a Game of Thrones-style teaser trailer for the season was released, hinting several locations of that season. Ed Valentine, writer of the Season 4 episodes "Flight to the Finish" and "Three's a Crowd" with the latter being a collaboration alongside headwriter Meghan McCarthy, confirmed via Twitter that he wrote two episodes for Season 6.

Promotion 
At the 2015 San Diego Comic-Con, while the show was in its fifth season, it was revealed that there will be an episode involving Fluttershy having a brother. However, in regards to whether Fluttershy's brother would be appearing in season five or not, director Jim Miller simply responded via Twitter "not [season five]".

One of the songs from the season's Christmas-themed episode was first previewed at the 2016 American Toy Fair in New York City.

Cast

Main 
 Tara Strong as Twilight Sparkle
 Rebecca Shoichet as Twilight Sparkle (singing voice)
 Tabitha St. Germain as Rarity
 Kazumi Evans as Rarity (singing voice)
 Ashleigh Ball as Applejack and Rainbow Dash
 Andrea Libman as Fluttershy and Pinkie Pie
 Shannon Chan-Kent as Pinkie Pie (singing voice); Libman occasionally
 Cathy Weseluck as Spike

Recurring 
 Kelly Sheridan as Starlight Glimmer
 Nicole Oliver as Princess Celestia
 Tabitha St. Germain as Princess Luna
 Aloma Steele as Princess Luna (singing voice)
 The Cutie Mark Crusaders
 Michelle Creber as Apple Bloom
 Madeleine Peters as Scootaloo
 Claire Corlett as Sweetie Belle
 John de Lancie as Discord

Minor

Single roles 

 Andrew Francis as Shining Armor
 Britt McKillip as Princess Cadance
 Ingrid Nilson as Maud Pie
 Richard Newman as Cranky Doodle
 Kelly Metzger as Spitfire
 Matt Hill as Soarin
 Cathy Weseluck as Miss Pommel
 Chantal Strand as Spoiled Rich
 Chiara Zanni as A.K. Yearling/Daring Do
 Nicole Oliver as Cheerilee
 Richard Ian Cox as Snails
 Kyle Rideout as Thorax
 Scott McNeil as Flam

Multiple roles 
 Ian Hanlin as Sunburst and Twilight Changeling
 Tabitha St. Germain as Flurry Heart, Mrs. Cake, Aloe, Granny Smith, and Hoofer Steps
 Peter New as Big McIntosh and Squizard
 Michael Dobson as Bulk Biceps and Dr. Caballeron
 Kathleen Barr as Trixie Lulamoon and Queen Chrysalis
 Andrea Libman as Fleetfoot and Bernard Rabbit
 Kelly Sheridan as Misty Fly and Vapor's mom
 Lee Tockar as Snips and Coriander Cumin
 Samuel Vincent as Flim and Party Favor
 Brian Drummond as Filthy Rich and Double Diamond
 Rebecca Shoichet as Sugar Belle and Night Glider

Guest stars

Single role 

 Andrew Francis as Mr. Sparkle
 Tara Strong as Mrs. Sparkle
 James Higuchi as Pouch Pony
 Travis Turner as Tender Taps
 Vincent Tong as Garble
 Matt Cowlrick as Dragon Lord Torch
 Ali Milner as Princess Ember
 Terry Klassen as Hoops
 William Samples as Professor Flintheart
 Lili Beaudoin as Plaid Stripes
 Caitlyn Bairstow as Blue Bobbin
 Colleen Winton as Mrs. Shy
 David Godfrey as Mr. Shy
 Ryan Beil as Zephyr Breeze
 Diana Kaarina as Saffron Masala
 Jim Miller as Chargrill Breadwinner
 Fiona Hogan as Zesty Gourmand
 Enid-Raye Adams as Orange Slice
 Patton Oswalt as Quibble Pants
 Michael Daingerfield as Braeburn
 Erin Mathews as Gabby
 David Stuart as Petunia's father
 Jim Byrnes as Gladmane
 Zara Durrani as Trapeze Star
 Alexis Heule as Angel Wings
 Emmett Hall as Sky Stinger
 Rhona Rees as Vapor Trail
 Peter Kelamis as Vapor's dad

Multiple roles 
 Alan Marriott as Buried Lede and Mr. Stripes
 Jason Simpson as Spa Worker and Line Pony
 Kelli Ogmundson as Petunia's mother and Petunia Paleo

Episodes

Notes

Songs

DVD release

References 

2016 American television seasons
2016 Canadian television seasons
6